Berthold Alfred Maria Schenk Graf von Stauffenberg (15 March 1905, Stuttgart – 10 August 1944, Berlin-Plötzensee) was a German aristocrat and lawyer who was a key conspirator in the plot to assassinate Adolf Hitler on 20 July 1944, alongside his younger brother, Colonel Claus Schenk Graf von Stauffenberg. After the plot failed, Berthold was tried and executed by the Nazi regime.

Early life
Berthold was the oldest of four brothers (the second being Berthold's twin Alexander Schenk Graf von Stauffenberg) born into an old and distinguished aristocratic South German Catholic family. His parents were the last Oberhofmarschall of the Kingdom of Württemberg, Alfred Schenk Graf von Stauffenberg, and Caroline née von Üxküll-Gyllenband. Among his ancestors were several famous Prussians, including most notably August von Gneisenau.

In his youth, he and his brothers were members of the Neupfadfinder, a German Scout association and part of the German Youth movement.

After having studied law at Tübingen, he became assistant professor of international law at the Kaiser Wilhelm Institute of Foreign and International Law in 1927. He and his brother Claus were introduced by Albrecht von Blumenthal to the circle of the mystic symbolist poet Stefan George, many of whose followers became members of the German Resistance to National Socialism. He worked at The Hague from 1930 to 1932 and in 1936 married Maria (Mika) Classen (1900–1977). They had two children: Alfred Claus Maria Schenk Graf von Stauffenberg (1937–1987) and Elisabeth Caroline Margarete Maria Schenk Gräfin von Stauffenberg (b. 13 June 1939). He lived with his family in Berlin-Wannsee.

Career and coup attempt
In 1939, he joined the German Navy, working in the High Command as a staff judge and advisor for international law.

Berthold's apartment at Tristanstraße in Berlin, where his brother Claus also lived for some time, was a meeting place for the 20 July conspirators, including their cousin Peter Yorck von Wartenburg. As Claus had access to the inner circle around Hitler, he was assigned to plant a bomb at the Führers briefing hut at the military high command in Rastenburg, East Prussia, on 20 July 1944. Claus then flew to Rangsdorf airfield south of Berlin where he met with Berthold. They went together to Bendlerstraße, which the coup leaders intended to use as the centre of their operations in Berlin.

Hitler survived the bomb blast and the coup failed. Berthold and his brother were arrested at Bendlerstraße the same night. Claus was executed by firing squad shortly afterwards.

After his arrest, Stauffenberg was questioned by the Gestapo about his views about the "Final Solution to the Jewish Question". Stauffenberg told the Gestapo that “he and his brother had basically approved of the racial principle of National Socialism, but considered it to be 'exaggerated' and 'excessive'” Stauffenberg went on to state,
The racial idea has been grossly betrayed in this war in that the best German blood is being irrevocably sacrificed, while simultaneously Germany is populated by millions of foreign workers, who certainly cannot be described as of high racial quality.

Berthold was tried in the Volksgerichtshof ("People's Court") by Roland Freisler on 10 August and was one of eight conspirators executed by strangulation, hanged in Plötzensee Prison, Berlin, later that day.  Before he was killed Berthold was strangled and then revived multiple times. The entire execution and multiple resuscitations were filmed for Hitler to view at his leisure.

Notes

References

Sources
 - Total pages: 208 

1905 births
1944 deaths
Max Planck Institute for Comparative Public Law and International Law people
Counts of Germany
Kriegsmarine personnel
Berthold
People from Bavaria executed by Nazi Germany
People from Bavaria executed at Plötzensee Prison
People executed by hanging at Plötzensee Prison
Roman Catholics in the German Resistance
Executed members of the 20 July plot
People from Günzburg (district)
People from the Kingdom of Bavaria
German twins